The 2014 Emporia State Hornets football team represented Emporia State University in the 2014 NCAA Division II football season. The Hornets played their home games on Jones Field at Francis G. Welch Stadium, in Emporia, Kansas as they have done since 1937. 2014 was the 121st season in school history. The Hornets were led by head coach Garin Higgins, who finished his 14th overall season, and eighth overall at Emporia State. Emporia State is a member of the Mid-America Intercollegiate Athletics Association.

Preseason outlook
Sporting News released their Top-25 on June 10, 2014. The Hornets were placed #22. Two days later the Lindy's NCAA Division II Preseason Top 25 was released, where the Hornets were placed at #13, nine spots higher than the Sporting News ranking.

The conference rankings were released on August 5. Emporia State was ranked 4th in the Coaches Poll and 3rd in the Media Poll.

On August 18, the AFCA poll was released. Emporia State was ranked at #22. Two other MIAA teams were ranked as well; Northwest Missouri State at #1 and Pittsburg State at #9.

On August 26, D2football.com released their Top 25 poll. Emporia State was chosen at #19, which is three ranks higher than the AFCA the Sporting News polls. Four other MIAA schools were ranked in the D2football.com poll; Northwest Missouri State at #1, Pittsburg State at #9, and Missouri Western at #24.

Schedule

Source:

Game summaries

Missouri Southern

This was the first meeting in football between the two schools since 2011. The last time ESU played MSSU, they won 31–24 after coming out of a 17–0 deficit at half.

In the first quarter, neither team scored, but in the second, Missouri Southern was the first to score a touchdown. MSSU had a total of 212 rushing yards compared to Emporia State's 273, and MSSU had 188 passing yards compared to ESU's 244.

Central Missouri

Like the previous game last week, this was the first meeting for ESU and UCM since 2010.

Central Oklahoma

Northeastern State

Lindenwood

Pittsburg State

Fort Hays State

Missouri Western

Washburn

Northwest Missouri State

Nebraska–Kearney

Personnel

Coaching staff
Along with Higgins, there are 7 assistants.

Roster

References

Emporia State
Emporia State Hornets football seasons
Emporia State Hornets football